William or Bill Archer may refer to:

 William Archer (British politician) (1677–1739), British politician
 William S. Archer (1789–1855), U.S. Senator and Representative from Virginia
 William Beatty Archer (1793–1870), Illinois politician and businessman
 William Archer (architect) (1820–1874), Tasmanian architect, naturalist, and politician

 William Archer (jockey, born 1826) (1826–1889), British jockey who rode in 9 Grand Nationals
 William Archer (naturalist) (1830–1897), Irish naturalist and microscopist especially interested in Protozoa and Desmids
 William Archer (New South Wales politician) (1831–1925), member of the New South Wales Legislative Assembly
 William Archer (critic) (1856–1924), Scottish dramatic critic and translator of Ibsen
 William Archer (jockey, died 1878), British jockey killed in a fall at Cheltenham
 William Andrew Archer (1894–1973), American economic botanist and plant collector
 William Archer (Toronto politician) (1919–2005), Canadian municipal politician
 Bill Archer (born 1928), U.S. Representative from Texas
 Bill Archer (businessman), British businessman

See also
 Archer family